Ixora lawsonii is a species of flowering plant in the family Rubiaceae. It is native to Karnataka and Kerala in India.

References

External links
World Checklist of Rubiaceae

lawsonii
Flora of Karnataka
Flora of Kerala
Endangered plants
Taxonomy articles created by Polbot
Taxobox binomials not recognized by IUCN